Belozem Hill (Halm Belozem) is the northeasternmost of a chain of hills along Bulgarian Beach on Hurd Peninsula in the east of Livingston Island, South Shetland Islands in Antarctica.  The hill is boulder-clay capped with twin summits; the higher east-northeastern of them rising to 41 m.  It is snow free in summer.  The hill was mapped by the Spanish Servicio Geográfico del Ejército in 1991, and by Bulgaria in 1996 and 2005.

Belozem is the name of a settlement in southern Bulgaria, ‘belozem’ being the Bulgarian for ‘white soil.’

Location
(According to a 1995-96 Bulgarian topographic survey.)

See also
 Livingston Island
 List of Bulgarian toponyms in Antarctica
 Antarctic Place-names Commission

Maps
 Isla Livingston: Península Hurd. Mapa topográfico de escala 1:25000. Madrid: Servicio Geográfico del Ejército, 1991. (Map reproduced on p. 16 of the linked work)
 L.L. Ivanov. Livingston Island: Central-Eastern Region. Scale 1:25000 topographic map.  Sofia: Antarctic Place-names Commission of Bulgaria, 1996.
 L.L. Ivanov et al. Antarctica: Livingston Island and Greenwich Island, South Shetland Islands. Scale 1:100000 topographic map. Sofia: Antarctic Place-names Commission of Bulgaria, 2005.
 L.L. Ivanov. Antarctica: Livingston Island and Greenwich, Robert, Snow and Smith Islands. Scale 1:120000 topographic map.  Troyan: Manfred Wörner Foundation, 2009.  
 Antarctica, South Shetland Islands, Livingston Island: Bulgarian Antarctic Base. Sheets 1 and 2. Scale 1:2000 topographic map. Geodesy, Cartography and Cadastre Agency, 2016. (in Bulgarian)
 Antarctic Digital Database (ADD). Scale 1:250000 topographic map of Antarctica. Scientific Committee on Antarctic Research (SCAR). Since 1993, regularly upgraded and updated.
 L.L. Ivanov. Antarctica: Livingston Island and Smith Island. Scale 1:100000 topographic map. Manfred Wörner Foundation, 2017.

References
 Belozem Hill. SCAR Composite Gazetteer of Antarctica
 Bulgarian Antarctic Gazetteer. Antarctic Place-names Commission. (details in Bulgarian, basic data in English)

External links
 Belozem Hill. Copernix satellite image

Hills of Antarctica